Parthenina suturalis is a species of sea snail, a marine gastropod mollusk in the family Pyramidellidae, the pyrams and their allies.

Distribution
This marine species occurs in the following locations:
 European waters (ERMS scope)
 Greek Exclusive Economic Zone
 Portuguese Exclusive Economic Zone
 Spanish Exclusive Economic Zone
 United Kingdom Exclusive Economic Zone

References

 Lygre F., Schander C., Kongsrud J.A. & Krakstad J.O. (2011) Three species of Parthenina (Chrysallidinae, Pyramidelloidea) new to West Africa. Journal of Conchology 40(4): 477-481 page(s): 478

External links
 To CLEMAM
 To Encyclopedia of Life
 To World Register of Marine Species

Pyramidellidae
Gastropods described in 1844